Ceromitia decepta is a species of moth of the  family Adelidae. It is known from South Africa.

References

Adelidae
Endemic moths of South Africa
Moths described in 1945
Taxa named by Anthonie Johannes Theodorus Janse